HBICtv: Ultra Rich Asian Girls is a Canadian reality television web series, broadcast in Mandarin and English, featuring daughters of affluent Chinese Canadians living in Vancouver, British Columbia, Canada.

The series was created by Kevin K. Li in 2014 and modeled after Lifestyles of Rich and Famous and the House Wives series.  It is produced by Veyron Media, Kevin K. Li, and Desmond Chen.

Ultra Rich Asian Girls has two seasons airing on YouTube, each hosted by four or five women:  Chelsea, Coco, Flo.Z, and Joy in the first season; Chelsea, Pam, Weymi, Ray, Lim May Yiin, and Diana in the second.  The series was filmed worldwide, including in Venice, Milan, Los Angeles, and New Mexico, as well as Vancouver.

Premise 
Kevin Li, the creator of HBICtv: Ultra Rich Asian Girls and House My Style, was born and raised in Vancouver’s working-class Eastside.  In the past few decades, he has witnessed the demographics of the city’s 400,000-strong Chinese community shift.  He grew up with second-generation immigrants from Hong Kong like himself, then noticed another generation of people flowing into Vancouver:  ones who were more affluent, with much more money to spend. Inspired by his curiosity about those ultra-rich people's lives, Kevin announced a casting call for his series Ultra Rich Asian Girls; and the responses exploded in Canada and Asia.

Ultra Rich Asian Girls features a group of Mandarin-speaking girls, who Li describes as "having fun, spending daddy’s money... enjoying life and funding an economy" and follows them as they shop, dine, and attend social functions. The show offers a unique perspective of the lives of ultra rich Asian girls—specifically examining the new-money class of fuerdai, Chinese "rich second generation", who provoke reactions of both "envy and censure" for their patterns of conspicuous consumption.

Casting

Season 1

Chelsea Jiang 
Chelsea was born in Ottawa, Ontario, Canada.  She studied in private schools in Beijing from the time she was seven years old until she was fourteen, and she was graduated from the Honour Math program in the University of British Columbia.  She wants to enter fashion and run her own business:  a clothing line called "C3", standing for "Choice, Change and Challenge".  In the first season of Ultra Rich Asian Girls, Chelsea shared her background, daily life, and attitudes.

Flo.Z (Florence) 
Florence was graduated from the prestigious master's program in the school of fashion design at Istituto Marangoni in Milan.  She speaks English, Mandarin, French, and a little Italian.  She is an entrepreneur and owns her own fashion line, "Flo.Z".  She shows her reflective, thoughtful side in the series.

Coco Paris 
Nineteen-year-old Coco is Taiwanese and aspires to become an entertainer (singing, dancing, and acting).  Coco has studied musical instruments since she was seven years old; she can play the guzheng, flute, drum, and violin.

Joy 
Joy is an international student focusing on fashion marketing.  She walked her first runway show in September 2014 and showed up during the Opening Gala of Vancouver Fashion Week in Summer 2015.  Her goal is to become a model.

Season 2

Chelsea Jiang 
Chelsea comes back to Ultra Rich Asian Girls Season 2!  In this season, she shares her excitement about being pregnant, welcoming her baby and new life.

Weymi 
Weymi graduated from Blanche Macdonald with a Fashion Marketing degree.  Her parents gave her half a million dollars, and she plans to launch a bilingual luxury-lifestyle magazine.

Pam 
Pam is the Founder of PLY Talent Management, a local modeling agency.  She also started a flower business, Concept Floral Vancouver.

Ray 
Ray holds a degree in Finance and Marketing from the Sauder School of Business at the University of British Columbia.  She has started Rono Marketing Group Ltd.

Diana 
Diana is a student at the University of British Columbia and is talented in languages - she speaks English, Chinese, Korean and Japanese.  She would like to bring out a real-estate app.

Series list

Season 1

Season 2

Media reviews 
Peter Guy of the South China Morning Post called the show a "case study in how not to flaunt wealth," citing the anonymous quote "You show me a highly unequal society and I’ll show you a revolution or a police state."

The show Ultra Rich Asian Girls features a cultural drama, girls in the show are not trying to be anyone else, they are trying to be Chinese. Moreover, the show was larger than fashion, wealth and reality TV. "I soon discovered issues of race, culture and gender were also present." said R!c, the editor at Asian Pacific Post. The series targets on the issues of cultural identity and changing trends in Chinese immigration, and the social value in the show "puts a certain group of people on the radar in a different way". (Alden Habacon, Oct 2014)

This series has exploded both in Canada and overseas Asia and has raised social discussion on Asian immigration to North America, and the unique problem of capitals concentration in a communist country like China.

References 

Television shows set in Vancouver
Television shows filmed in Vancouver
Canadian non-fiction web series
2014 Canadian television series debuts
2015 Canadian television series endings
2010s Canadian reality television series
Women in British Columbia
Chinese-Canadian culture in Vancouver